Jenny Sarah Slate (born March 25, 1982) is an American actress, stand-up comedian, and writer.

Following early acting and stand-up roles on television, Slate gained recognition for her live variety shows in New York City and for co-creating, writing, and producing the children's short film and book series Marcel the Shell with Shoes On (2010–present). She became more widely known as a cast member on the 35th season of Saturday Night Live between 2009 and 2010 and for subsequent roles in the comedic series Bob's Burgers (2012–present), Parks and Recreation (2013–2015), House of Lies (2013–2015), Kroll Show (2013–2015).

Slate's breakout role came with her leading performance in the coming-of-age comedy-drama film Obvious Child (2014), for which she won the Critics' Choice Movie Award for Best Actress in a Comedy and was nominated for an Independent Spirit Award and Gotham Independent Film Award. She lent voice performances to the animated films The Lorax (2012), Zootopia (2016), The Secret Life of Pets film franchise (2016–2019), The Lego Batman Movie, and Despicable Me 3 (both 2017), and she ventured into dramatic roles with her supporting performance as Bonnie in Gifted (2017). She also appeared in the critically acclaimed science-fiction film Everything Everywhere All At Once.

Starting in 2017, Slate, who is Jewish, appeared on the animated Netflix series Big Mouth as the biracial Black–Jewish character Missy Foreman-Greenwald. She exited the role in 2020 because she felt it should be played by a Black actress; Slate has continued to voice other various characters on the show.

Early life and education
Slate was born on March 25, 1982, in Milton, Massachusetts, to Ron Slate, a businessman and poet who worked as vice president of global communications for the EMC Corporation and later as CEO of a biotech startup, and Nancy (née Gilson), a housewife who also made pottery. She is the middle child of three, with an older sister, Abigail, and younger sister, Stacey. She and her family are Jewish. One of her grandmothers was born in Cuba and was raised in France. After graduating from Milton Academy as the valedictorian, Slate attended Columbia University as a literature major, where she helped form the improv group Fruit Paunch, starred in the Varsity Show and met Gabe Liedman, who would become her comedy partner. Slate graduated from Columbia in 2004.

Career
She and Gabe Liedman formed the comedy duo Gabe & Jenny. Their stand-up shows with Max Silvestri, "Big Terrific," were named best new variety show of 2008 by Time Out New York. In 2015, Slate, Liedman, and Silvestri ended the show, citing their busy schedules, though they have since occasionally performed together.

Slate first met Liedman in 2000 while attending Columbia University. They describe their relationship as a "nonsexual romance"; Slate says, "I like to think of us as kind of like Elaine Benes and George Costanza, but we like each other." Throughout 2008 and 2009, Slate regularly performed her one-woman show titled Jenny Slate: Dead Millionaire at the Upright Citizens Brigade Theatre (UCBT) in New York City.

Slate was a regular commentator on many VH1 "talking head" commentary programs. In early 2009, she had made several appearances on the Late Night with Jimmy Fallon recurring sketch "7th Floor West", where she played an NBC page also named Jenny, who was later promoted to Fallon's assistant. She had a recurring role in Bored to Death. Slate's guest appearances on television programs include Bob's Burgers, Girls, The Whitest Kids U' Know, Important Things with Demetri Martin and Raising Hope.

Slate joined the cast of Saturday Night Live for the 2009-10 season. In her first episode, she accidentally said "fucking" during her debut sketch "Biker Chick Chat", which was heard on the live broadcast, but removed from reruns. In various sketches, she impersonated Hoda Kotb, Lady Gaga, Kristen Stewart, Ashley Olsen, and Olympia Snowe. She was best known for Tina-Tina Cheneuse, an infomercial pitchwoman who advertises personalized doorbells, car horns, and alarm clocks. Slate's contract was not renewed for another season. Despite rumors to the contrary, Slate has insisted that her SNL termination was not due to cursing but rather simply because "I didn't click."

In August 2010, she co-wrote and voiced the animated short film Marcel the Shell with Shoes On, which garnered viral success. This led to Marcel the Shell with Shoes on, Two. Slate also wrote a "Marcel"-themed children's book that was released on November 1, 2011. Her first major film role was as Zoe in Alvin and the Chipmunks: Chipwrecked; more films followed in 2012, including the voice of Ted's mother in The Lorax.

Her first appearance in Parks and Recreation was in the 2013 episode "Bailout", in which she portrayed Mona-Lisa Saperstein. Following her success on the NBC show, Slate released and starred in a 12-episode mini-series on YouTube called Catherine, celebrating late 1980s and early 1990s soap-opera aesthetics. On July 23, 2013, she appeared in Drunk History retelling the history of how Coca-Cola was made.

In 2014, Slate starred in the comedy-drama film Obvious Child, which follows the life of a young stand-up comic as she grapples with an unplanned pregnancy and eventual abortion. Slate went on to win the Critics Choice Award for Best Actress in a Comedy, Best Breakout Performance at the Newport Beach Film Festival, the Virtuosos Award at the Santa Barbara International Film Festival, and Best Comedic Actress at the Women Film Critics Circle Awards for her performance in the film.

Slate co-starred with Judy Greer and Nat Faxon in the first season of the FX series Married. She left the series as a series regular in season two, but still appeared in a few episodes. Sarah Burns took her place in the series.

Slate appeared as Liz B. in the recurring "PubLIZity" sketches in Kroll Show, as well as many other recurring and one-off characters, performing in some capacity in almost every episode until the series ended in 2015. In 2016, Slate voiced Dawn Bellwether in the Disney animated comedy-adventure film Zootopia and Gidget in the animated feature The Secret Life of Pets.

Slate and her father co-wrote a book titled About the House about their time living in Slate's childhood home in Milton, Massachusetts, which was published in December 2016.

In 2017, Slate starred in the film Gifted as Bonnie Stevenson, the teacher of a 7-year-old mathematical genius.

In October 2019, Slate released a stand-up comedy special on Netflix, titled Stage Fright.

Slate published her book titled Little Weirds, about her struggles with and thoughts about life and relationships, in 2019.

From 2017 until 2019, Slate voiced the biracial character Missy Foreman-Greenwald on the animated Netflix series Big Mouth. Slate exited the role on June 24, 2020, writing on Instagram that "At the start of the show, I reasoned with myself that it was permissible for me to play Missy because her mom is Jewish and White — as am I. But Missy is also Black and Black characters on an animated show should be played by Black people."

In 2022, she appeared in the critically-acclaimed science fiction film Everything Everywhere All at Once as Big Nose. Her character's original name was changed to Debbie the Dog Mom for the film's digital release due to its association with Jewish stereotypes.

Personal life
Slate lived in Cobble Hill, Brooklyn, before moving with filmmaker Dean Fleischer Camp to Los Angeles in the early 2010s. In September 2012, Slate married Fleischer-Camp. They collaborated on the Marcel the Shell with Shoes On, on both the books and the short films. The pair announced their separation in May 2016. She dated actor Chris Evans for a brief period.

In September 2019, Slate announced her engagement to art curator and author Ben Shattuck, owner of Davolls General Store. On December 10, 2020, Slate revealed on Late Night with Seth Meyers that she was expecting her first child with Shattuck. On February 3, 2021, Slate appeared on Jimmy Kimmel Live! and announced she gave birth to a daughter six weeks prior. Her daughter is named Ida Lupine Shattuck. Shattuck and Slate married in their living room on New Year's Eve 2021, their fourth attempt at a wedding after the first three were canceled during the COVID-19 pandemic.

Filmography

Film

Television

Music videos

Podcasts
Earth Break

Awards and nominations

Bibliography

Notes

References

External links

 
 

1982 births
Living people
21st-century American actresses
21st-century American women writers
American stand-up comedians
American children's writers
American impressionists (entertainers)
American voice actresses
American film actresses
American television actresses
American women comedians
American feminist writers
American people of Cuban-Jewish descent
Annie Award winners
Columbia College (New York) alumni
Hispanic and Latino American actresses
Jewish American actresses
Jewish feminists
Jewish American female comedians
Milton Academy alumni
American women children's writers
Actresses from Massachusetts
People from Milton, Massachusetts
American sketch comedians
Comedians from Massachusetts
Upright Citizens Brigade Theater performers
Outstanding Performance by a Cast in a Motion Picture Screen Actors Guild Award winners
21st-century American comedians
21st-century American singers
21st-century American women singers
People from Cobble Hill, Brooklyn
21st-century American Jews